Perham is a town in Aroostook County, Maine, United States. The population was 371 at the 2020 census. The town was named after Maine's 33rd governor, Sidney Perham.

Geography

Demographics

2010 census
At the 2010 census there were 386 people, 151 households, and 105 families living in the town. The racial makeup of the town was 97.4% White, 2.3% Native American, and 0.3% from two or more races.
Of the 151 households 27.8% had children under the age of 18 living with them, 59.6% were married couples living together, 3.3% had a female householder with no husband present, 6.6% had a male householder with no wife present, and 30.5% were non-families. 23.8% of households were one person and 11.9% were one person aged 65 or older. The average household size was 2.56 and the average family size was 3.04.

The median age in the town was 45.3 years. 20.2% of residents were under the age of 18; 6.9% were between the ages of 18 and 24; 22% were from 25 to 44; 34.9% were from 45 to 64; and 15.8% were 65 or older. The gender makeup of the town was 51.0% male and 49.0% female.

2000 census
At the 2000 census there were 434 people, 162 households, and 114 families living in the town.  The population density was 11.9 people per square mile (4.6/km).  There were 177 housing units at an average density of 4.8 per square mile (1.9/km).  The racial makeup of the town was 96.08% White, 0.92% Native American, and 3.00% from two or more races.
Of the 162 households 28.4% had children under the age of 18 living with them, 61.1% were married couples living together, 7.4% had a female householder with no husband present, and 29.6% were non-families. 21.6% of households were one person and 10.5% were one person aged 65 or older.  The average household size was 2.68 and the average family size was 3.22.

The age distribution was 24.0% under the age of 18, 8.8% from 18 to 24, 24.2% from 25 to 44, 24.2% from 45 to 64, and 18.9% 65 or older.  The median age was 40 years. For every 100 females, there were 99.1 males.  For every 100 females age 18 and over, there were 103.7 males.

The median household income was $25,962 and the median family income  was $31,250. Males had a median income of $25,341 versus $17,917 for females. The per capita income for the town was $11,721.  About 7.8% of families and 11.2% of the population were below the poverty line, including 17.2% of those under age 18 and 6.5% of those age 65 or over.

References

Towns in Aroostook County, Maine
Towns in Maine